Erich Fritz Schweinburg (June 11, 1890 – July 7, 1959) was a Jewish-Austrian writer and attorney. He is best known for writing Eine weite Reise, published in Austria, his account of the year he spent as a prisoner in Dachau concentration camp in Nazi Germany.

Biography

Early life
Schweinburg was born on June 11, 1890, in Nikolsburg, Moravia.  He was the eldest son of Emanuel and Leontine (née Czinczar).  His younger brothers were Erwin and Franz.   The family were builders.  In Nikolsburg Moravia, there was a residential street named for  his relative Emil Schweinburg a benefactor of Jews and Christians alike:  Emil Schweinburg Strasse now called Husova Street.  It was the hub street in the Jewish Ghetto.

Attorney
Schweinburg practiced in the law courts of Vienna.  In New York, as an attorney, with Henrietta Kierman he compiled a "Bibliography on Political, Economic and Social Backgrounds of Certain European Countries",  for the Department of Statistics in 1944 at the Russell Sage foundation.  In 1945 he wrote the book "Law Training in Continental Europe, Its Principles and Public Function".

Dachau

Immigration

Writing career
Schweinburg was an author of novels, short stories.  He also published a public service book entitled Law Training in Continental Europe: Its Principles and Public Function

He is best known for his autobiographical work Eine Weite Reise, Wien : Löcker, 1988.

New York and Vermont
Schweinburg worked for the Russell Sage Foundation.

Personal life
Born to a wealthy Jewish family, Schweinburg attended the University of Vienna.  He became an attorney. He and Rosa Gussman married in Austria and had one child, Raina Schweinburg, married to Philipp Fehl.

Bibliography
Eine weite Reise, Schweinburg, Erich F.. - Wien : Löcker, 1988
Law training in continental Europe,Schweinburg, Erich F.. - New York, NY : Russell Sage Foundation, 1945
Ein Weg zur Vorbereitung des menschlichen Singapparates für den Kunstgesang, Schweinburg, Ernst. - Wien : Europ. Verl., 1937
Das Europäische Speditionsrecht, Wien VI : Zoll-Speditions- u. Schiffahrtszeitung, 1929
Berliner politische Nachrichten, Berlin : Schweinburg

References

External links 
  https://web.archive.org/web/20160303180408/https://portal.d-nb.de/opac.htm?method=simpleSearch&query=Schweinburg
  http://www.literaturepochen.at/exil/multimedia/pdf/exilantenlistereinhard.pdf
  http://www.literaturhaus.at/buch/fachbuch/rez/bolbecher01/
  http://sthweb.bu.edu/archives/index.php?option=com_awiki&view=mediawiki&article=Raina_Fehl
  https://openlibrary.org/b/OL1822868M/Eine_weite_Reise
  https://www.amazon.com/Narrating-Holocaust-Continuum-Guide-Studies/dp/0826477682/ref=sr_1_2?ie=UTF8&s=books&qid=1271361329&sr=8-2

1890 births
1959 deaths
20th-century Austrian novelists
Austrian male short story writers
American male short story writers
Austrian male writers
Austrian emigrants to the United States
20th-century American novelists
American male novelists
Dachau concentration camp survivors
The Holocaust in Austria
Jewish American writers
Austrian Jews
American people of Czech-Jewish descent
People from Mikulov
20th-century American short story writers
20th-century American male writers
20th-century American Jews